Blue Hill may refer to:

Places
 Blue Hill, Saint Helena, a district at the western end of the island of Saint Helena

United States 
 Blue Hill, Kansas
 Blue Hill, Maine, a town
 Blue Hill (CDP), Maine, the main village in the town
 Blue Hill, Nebraska, a small city
 Blue Hill (New York), a mountain in Sullivan County
 Blue Hill, Texas
 Blue Hill Township, Sherburne County, Minnesota
 Great Blue Hill, a summit in Massachusetts
 Blue Hill Meteorological Observatory, on Great Blue Hill

Other uses
 Blue Hill (restaurant), New York City
 Blue Hill at Stone Barns, a restaurant in Pocantico Hills, New York
 Blue Hill KF, a Swedish football club

See also
 East Blue Hill, Maine
 Blue Bell Hill (disambiguation)
 Blue Hills (disambiguation)
 Blueberry Hill (disambiguation)
 Cerro Azul (disambiguation) (Blue Hill in Portuguese and Spanish)